Blackstone Building is a historic commercial building located in downtown Fort Wayne, Indiana. It was designed by noted Fort Wayne architect Charles R. Weatherhogg and built in 1927. It is a three-story, three bay, Classical Revival style brick building. The front facade features panelled Ionic order pilasters topped by a modillion cornice and a shaped parapet.  Its upper stories are clad in white terra cotta.  The building originally housed the Blackstone Shop, an exclusive women's clothing store.

It was listed on the National Register of Historic Places in 1988.

References

Commercial buildings on the National Register of Historic Places in Indiana
Commercial buildings completed in 1927
Neoclassical architecture in Indiana
Buildings and structures in Fort Wayne, Indiana
National Register of Historic Places in Fort Wayne, Indiana